Seven Standards (1985), Vols. 1 & 2 is a two volume set by free jazz musician Anthony Braxton.  It was recorded January 30 – 31, 1985.  The album is less free than most of Braxton's previous work and features jazz standards arranged in the usual jazz-combo style.

Track listing

Volume 1
"Joy Spring" (Clifford Brown) – 7:33
"Spring Is Here" (m. Richard Rodgers w. Lorenz Hart) – 3:53
"I Remember You" (m. Victor Schertzinger w. Johnny Mercer) – 5:22
"Toy" (Clifford Jordan) – 6:33
"You Go to My Head" (m. J. Fred Coots w. Haven Gillespie) – 9:35
"Old Folks" (m. Willard Robison w. Dedette Lee Hill) – 7:10
"Background Music" (Warne Marsh)– 5:34

Volume 2
"Moment's Notice" (John Coltrane) – 8:33
"Ruby, My Dear" (Thelonious Monk) – 5:11
"Groovin' High" (Dizzy Gillespie) – 6:40
"Yardbird Suite" (Charlie Parker) – 4:31
"Nica's Dream" (Horace Silver) – 4:19
"Milestones" (Miles Davis) – 4:35
"Trinkle Tinkle" (Thelonious Monk) – 6:20

Personnel
Anthony Braxton - saxophones
Rufus Reid  - bass
Victor Lewis  - drums
Hank Jones  - piano
Michael Cuscuna  - producer
Steve Backer  - executive producer

References

Anthony Braxton albums
1985 albums